Joh's Jury is a 1993 Australian television film about the perjury trial of Sir Joh Bjelke-Petersen.

References

External links

Joh's Jury at ABC Commercial
Review at Sydney Morning Herald

Australian television films
1993 films
1990s English-language films